This is a list of cases of people who have osteogenesis imperfecta.

Activists and speakers 
Raul Krauthausen – German/Colombian activist and recipient of the Order of Merit of Germany.
 Robby Novak (stage name Kid President) – a motivational speaker and YouTube personality as of 2013. He often comments on his own ability to overcome the disorder.
Peter Radtke – German founder of Die Deutsche Gesellschaft für Osteogenesis Imperfecta, also a philologist and actor.
Sean Stephenson – an American therapist, self-help author and motivational speaker.

Entertainers

Actors 
Jack Binstead – British actor known for a role in the British sitcom Bad Education.
Julie Fernandez – British actress best known for her role in the British The Office.
Rick Howland – Canadian actor who is known for playing Trick on Lost Girl. 
Kerry Ingram – British child actress best known for her role as Shireen Baratheon in the HBO series Game of Thrones and Matilda Wormwood in Matilda the Musical. 
Quentin Kenihan – Australian reality TV personality who played Corpus Colossus in Mad Max: Fury Road.
Tarah Lynne Schaeffer – Sesame Street actress.
Nabil Shaban – A Jordanian-British actor and writer who founded Graeae Theatre Company, which promotes performers with disabilities.
Atticus Shaffer – American who plays Brick Heck on The Middle.

Comedians 
 – A French humorist.

Musicians 

Jake Hardman - chamber pop artist from Manchester, U.K. 
Randy Guss – Drummer for Toad the Wet Sprocket.
Kalyn Heffernan – A Hip-hop artist and producer known for the group Wheelchair Sports Camp.
Gaelynn Lea – A violinist who has worked with Alan Sparhawk and won an NPR Music contest.
Michel Petrucciani – French jazz pianist who was granted a Légion d'honneur in Paris.
 – Danish singer who also acts.
Jay Thomas Manuel – Music producer and social media influencer known as Mini Producer
Sparsh Shah - Indian American rapper, singer, songwriter and inspirational speaker from New Jersey, US.

Journalists and writers 
Franco Bomprezzi – An Italian journalist who received the Order of Merit in 2007.
 – Polish journalist and radio announcer associated to Radio Maryja.
Dyson Carter – Canadian writer, editor, and political activist.
Christopher Hewitt – British poet and namesake of the Christopher Hewitt Award.
Natalie Lloyd – Children's author.
Firdaus Kanga – Parsi playwright known for Trying to Grow.
Philippe Rahmy – French speaking poet and novelist who has received the Prix Dentan among others. 
Stella Young – Australian comedian and journalist.

Politicians 
Nicky Chapman, Baroness Chapman – A British peer and disability rights activist.
Theresia Haidlmayr – She had been a politician of Austria's The Greens – The Green Alternative.
Freyja Haraldsdóttir – A member of the Icelandic Constitutional Assembly of 2010.

People in sports and games 
Valentin Baus – German Paralympic silver medalist in table tennis.
McKenzie Coan – American Paralympic gold medalist in swimming.
Doug Herland – American Olympic bronze medalist coxswain.
Taylor Lipsett – An American Paralympic gold and bronze medalist in ice sledge hockey.
Bobby Nail – American bridge player in the ACBL Hall of Fame.
 – A Paralympic multiple medalist in shooting for Germany.
 – A Paralympic swimmer for Mexico.
Jeremy Synot – A former Australian wheelchair basketball player and current National Wheelchair Basketball League Head Coach of the RSL Queensland Spinning Bullets.
Jordanne Whiley – A British Paralympic bronze medalist in Wheelchair tennis at the 2012 Summer Paralympics.

Notable as a subject 
Madge Bester – A South African woman and formerly the "world's shortest living woman".
Leo Beuerman – The subject of the documentary Leo Beuerman, which was nominated for the Academy Award for Best Documentary (Short Subject).
Lin Yü-chih – He had once been counted as the "world's shortest man".

Royalty
Prince Oddone, Duke of Montferrat – member of House of Savoy.

Technology
Fredrick Brennan – software developer and type designer who founded the imageboard website 8chan.

Disputed
French artist Henri de Toulouse-Lautrec. His short stature and health problems are believed to have been due to congenital factors, but he was never diagnosed with a specific disorder and recent theories suggest that he had a mild form of osteopetrosis instead. 
Viking invader of England, Ivar the Boneless: There is notable speculation about his physical condition; but objective diagnosis is not possible since his skeleton was exhumed and burnt 200 years after his death by William the Conqueror.

Fictional cases

Figures in film, television, video games and novels depicted as having osteogenesis imperfecta include:
 Samuel L. Jackson's character Elijah Price in M. Night Shyamalan's 2000 film Unbreakable and its 2019 follow-up Glass, who was born with type I osteogenesis imperfecta.
 Asa Butterfield's character Gardner Elliot in Peter Chelsom's 2017 film The Space Between Us was born with osteogenesis imperfecta due to being born on the planet Mars.
Ivana Baquero's character Mandy from the 2005 film Fragile had osteogenesis imperfecta. Her nurse becomes obsessed with her and abuses her to keep her injured enough to not be discharged from the hospital, before eventually murdering her and committing suicide. 
V.C. Andrews's character Vera from the 1982 book and 2015 film My Sweet Audrina had osteogenesis imperfecta. As a child, she sometimes intentionally broke her bones because after a break was the only time that her neglectful and abusive father ever showed her any affection. As an adult, she dies falling down a flight of stairs. 
Jodi Picoult's character Willow O'Keefe from the 2009 book Handle with Care is born with type III. Her mother files a wrongful birth lawsuit against her doctor, because of it.
Jeff "Joker" Moreau, a character from the Mass Effect video game series voiced by Seth Green. Given that the series is set in the fictional future, he is able to take medications to help with his disease and is a pilot. The medication, along with a mix of Cerberus implants and braces, allows him to walk and dance, although not as fluidly as others without the disease.
Grey’s Anatomy characters, Jackson Avery and April Kepner’s son, Samuel Norbert Avery had type II osteogenesis imperfecta. He was baptized and died within minutes.
The titular character of Frank Portman's novel Andromeda Klein has osteogenesis imperfecta, making her hard-of-hearing.

References

Osteogenesis imperfecta
Osteogenesis imperfecta